is a Japanese manga series written and illustrated by George Manabe. It was first serialized in Kadokawa Shoten's Comic Comp Magazine beginning November 1989 up to January 1993. The series transferred publication to MediaWorks's Dengeki Comic Gao! Magazine from February 1993 to November 2001. The series focuses on Rai Ryuga, a young courageous warrior who seeks to unify the cosmos in a war against other two powerful forces. The series borrows heavily from events of the Sengoku period and events from the Chinese novel Romance of the Three Kingdoms.

An anime adaptation of the series aired on TV Tokyo from April 8, 1994, to March 31, 1995. It was known outside Japan as Thunder Jet: Raiders of the Galaxy Empire.

Plot
After the collapse of the Sacred Galaxy Empire, a battle for control of the Milky Way Galaxy breaks out among the warlords. From the chaos emerges a young courageous warrior, Rai Ryuga. A fearless warrior to his foes but to others, he is a gentle soul, dependable and loyal. Two powerful forces aspire to reign over the entire Empire: Hiki Danjo, ruler of the Northern Region of the Milky Way, and Lord Masamune, ruler of the Southern Region. Rai sees the ensuing battle and ponders the ultimate goal: to battle against other factions in order to reunify the Milky Way under one ruler and that one day he will bring peace to the galaxy.

Characters

The protagonist and a hero of the series. His actual age remain unknown but in the manga he was about 18 years old at the time he was in Danjo's army. He joined the Army of the Kingdom of Gojo as a Private, but he was quickly promoted to platoon leader and, later, as battalion commander after successive victories in critical battles. In the anime, Rai is portrayed as more of a hero and is more one dimensional compared to his manga appearance. In the manga, he begins with an attitude similar to his anime portrayal, but as the story progresses, his ambitions leave consequences that enable him to rise higher within the ranks of the galactic kingdoms at the expense of the lives of numerous key characters ; this makes Rai a more complex individual who, as he keeps gaining more power, is tragically torn between choosing the right thing to do and following his ambition to become the emperor regardless of the casualties. After Simone's death in both versions (Muraya in the manga), Rai vows to become a just ruler who will unite the galaxy and protect the people living in peace. His overzealous dream of becoming the ruler of the galaxies serves as Geni's main source of strength, indirectly causing Simone's death and much of the conflicts fought by Rai throughout the story. In the manga's special epilogue chapter, an older Rai (now emperor) meets Jamka, the son he conceived through a secret affair with Lord Masamune, and the one who would truly realize Simone's dream of unifying the galaxy.

 A 34-year-old monk born in the same planet as Rai. He has tremendous physical strength while being very loyal to him.

 A 14-year-old boy who tags along with Rai and Unkai. Often seen using a gun during battles. He died in a mission in the manga when he tried to bomb the Ren Kingdom warships by disguise as a Ren's soldier. During the mission, his masquerade was exposed and severely injured by many of the soldiers on the ship; therefore, he decided to sacrifice by setting off the explosion in the gunpowder unit, blow up a series of ships instantly that later led to Rai's victory.

 A little girl who serves as an attendant for Simone, she is also a younger sister of Kagan. She loves and trusts her very much. In the manga she is Kagan (Kagyoku)'s younger sister, as well as a much less important character; despite being assigned as Simone's servant, Lan-Lan is not given much of a role. In the end of the manga she becomes Soukuka's wife.

Media

Manga
The original manga is released in November 1989 up to January 1993 and was serialized in Kadokawa Shoten's Comic Comp magazine. The manga is compiled into 6 tankobon volumes on its first released. The series then moved to MediaWorks's Dengeki Comic Gao! and ran from February 1993 to November 2001, compiling the series up to 16 tankobon volumes. The entire manga series is later available in both Kadokawa's BookWalker app in Japan and in Amazon's Amazon Kindle app.

Anime
The anime adaptation of the manga was animated by E&G Films and aired on TV Tokyo in Japan from April 8, 1994, to March 31, 1995. Seiji Okuda directed the series with scripts written by Jinzō Toriumi. (Science Ninja Team Gatchaman, Yatterman) Norihiko Tanimoto performed the series's opening theme  while Mari Sasaki sang the ending theme 

In 1993, one year before the anime aired on TV, the president of Kadokawa Shoten Haruki Kadokawa was arrested for instructing photographer Takeshi Ikeda, a close aide, to smuggle cocaine from the United States on several occasions. He was charged with smuggling and embezzling money from his company in order to fund the drug purchases. The arrest resulted in Kadokawa's anime productions to be produced under lower budget to studios such as E&G Films. Because of this incident, George Manabe has voiced a dislike for the anime adaptation, further stating he wanted everyone involved in the anime production to get a death sentence. It also was aired in TPI (now MNCTV), Indonesia during 1995. As of 2021, the show has not been released in any format.

Episodes

Video game
A hybrid real-time strategy turn-based video game adaptation was released for the Super Nintendo Entertainment System by Angel (Bandai) exclusively in Japan in 1996.

References

External links 
 
 

1989 manga
1994 anime television series debuts
Space opera anime and manga
Sengoku period in fiction